The Eureka Baseball Club of Newark or the Newark Eurekas was a baseball team in Newark, New Jersey, United States.

The Eureka team was part of the NABBP in the 1850s and 1860s.  The Eureka Club first began playing other members of the NABBP in 1860.  They played at a field at Ferry Street and Adams Street in the Ironbound.

Players*

Other players for the team in 1860 were H. Brientnall, A. Littlewood, E Benedict, P. Baldwin, E. Thomas, T. Price and R. Elsden.  Brientnall played five games; Littlewood, three; Benedict, two; and the other four members played only in a single game during the season.

This roster is from the 1860 NABBP season.

Season by season

1860
The Eurekas had the eleventh best win percentage and the eight most wins.  They batted in the fifth most runs of any team at 213.
1861
Newark only played one game against the Enterprise baseball club from Brooklyn and beat them 27–5.
1862
Newark played only two games this season against ranked NABBP ballclubs.  They lost to the Mutuals by one run and beat the Gothams by five runs.  
Newark played three games this season: two against New York Clubs and one against the Athletic club from Philadelphia.  The Eurekas beat the team from Philadelphia by two runs, but lost to the two New York clubs in August.
1864
The Eurekas had the tenth best win percentage and the tenth most wins in the league, despite having the fifth lowest number of runs in the league.  They won exactly half of the eight games that they played.
1865
The Eurekas finished the season with the sixth best record and the sixth most wins with a record of nine and five.  They also had the sixth best team runs batted in at 339 in their fourteen games.
1866
The NABBP saw a lot of growth this season with nearly sixty teams, but Newark was still able to maintain an excellent standing, as they had the ninth most wins.  The Eureka club was also in the top third for winning percentage.  They had a nine and six record and batted in 446 runs in these fifteen games.  This was the seventh most runs by a single team in the league in 1866.  On August 28, seventeen-year-old Candy Cummings comes in for pitcher Asa Brainard of the Brooklyn Excelsiors, leading his team to a 24–2 win.  Candy Cummings is said to be the first pitcher to throw a curveball and for his future performance in the National League was inducted into the Baseball Hall of Fame.
1867
This was the first year the Eureka club really struggled during the season.  They only won two of their ten games, giving them for the first time one of the worst winning percentages in the league, although there were nine team who didn't win a game in 1867.  They had a reasonable number of runs batted in at 230, but was a small number for this team that had over two hundred more the prior season (only having played five more games).
1868
The team only played four games this season and won half.  They only drove in 77 runs for the four games.
1869
The Eureka Club only participated in two games in 1869 and lost both, with margins of eight and nine.

Scores

Note - Based on games recorded in Marshall Wright's book.

References

Wright, Marshall. D.  "The National Association of Base Ball Players, 1857-1870."  Jefferson, North Carolina: McFarland & Company, Inc.: 2000.  

National Association of Base Ball Players teams
Sports in Newark, New Jersey
Defunct baseball teams in New Jersey
Baseball teams disestablished in 1869
Baseball teams established in 1860
1860 establishments in New Jersey
1869 disestablishments in New Jersey